Royal Air Maroc, more commonly known as RAM, is the Moroccan national carrier, as well as the country largest airline.

RAM is wholly owned by the Moroccan Government, and has its headquarters on the grounds of Casablanca-Anfa Airport. It joined the Oneworld alliance in 2020.

From its base at Mohammed V International Airport, the carrier operates a domestic network in Morocco, scheduled international flights to Africa, Asia, Europe, and North and South America, and occasional charter flights that include Hajj services.

History

Formation 

The fleet of the newly formed airline included six Bretagnes, four Commandos, five DC-3s and two Languedocs. These aircraft worked on routes previously served by the predecessor companies, and added the cities of Frankfurt, Geneva and Paris.

Early years 
Hajj flights commenced in 1957.

In , the airline ordered two Caravelles. In July, a number of long-haul routes were launched using four Lockheed L-749 Constellations leased from Air France, and the coastal Oran–Oujda run — which had been suspended in May — was reopened. Also in 1958, the carrier started flying to Gibraltar. The arrival of the Constellations enabled the airline to withdraw the DC-4s from service.

By 1964, there were three Caravelles in the fleet. A fourth was ordered in late 1964.

At , the company had 758 employees and chairmanship was held by Mohammed Al Fassi. The route network included services within North Africa, and also linked North Africa with France, Germany, Italy, Spain and Switzerland; the Casablanca–Dakar and Casablanca–Las Palmas sectors were also flown. Shareholding at the time was split between the government of Morocco (64%), Air France (21%), Compagnie Generale Transatlantique (7.6%), Aviacion y Comercio (5%) and others (2.4%). An order for a fifth Caravelle was placed in early 1968. By 1969, all routes to Europe and North Africa were flown using solely these aircraft.

1970s 
In 1969, the carrier placed its first order with Boeing. Royal Air Maroc took delivery of the first Boeing aircraft, a Boeing 727-200, in 1970, with the carrier deploying it on revenue service on 15 May.

The RAM's fleet at  comprised two Boeing 727-200s, along with four Caravelles and two SIAI Marchetti SF.260s. At a cost of  million, a third Boeing 727-200 was ordered in 1972. In 1974, the carrier ordered a single Boeing 727-200 Advanced, followed by an order for a fourth Boeing 727-200. Also that year, negotiations with Air France for the lease of a Boeing 707-320B started. By , the Boeing 707 was part of an 11-strong fleet, along with four Boeing 727-200s, four Caravelles, and two SIAI Marchetti SF.260s. During the year, the company acquired three Boeing 737-200s to replace the Caravelles. Also in 1975, a weekly non-stop service to Rio de Janeiro was started. An order for three more Boeing 727-200s was placed in early 1976. That year, the four Caravelles were withdrawn from service and sold.

1980s 
By , Royal Air Maroc had 3,583 employees. At this time, the carrier fleet consisted of a single Boeing 747-200B, two Boeing 707-320Cs, one Boeing 707-320, seven Boeing 727-200s and three Boeing 737-200s. Another Boeing 727-200, ordered in January that year, was still pending delivery. Late that year, the airline joined the International Air Transport Association.

In , RAM was the first African airline to put the Boeing 757 in service. The first of these aircraft that was delivered to the company set a record for the type when it flew the distance separating Seattle from Casablanca, non-stop.

1990s 
In the early days of the decade, the last of the Boeing 707s was removed from the fleet. Meanwhile, newer, more efficient, Classic 400 and 500 Series Boeing 737s were introduced to increase the frequency of European routes. By the middle of the decade all 727s had disappeared. To consolidate its North American operations, Royal Air Maroc purchased a single Boeing 747-400. As the decade progressed, new routes to previously under-served African airports were opened.

2000-present 
With the increasing number of passengers and newly opened routes as well as increasing oil prices, there was a need to buy new aircraft. In 2000 an order for 20 Next-Generation Boeing 737 aircraft and 4 Airbus A321s was placed. Meanwhile, more routes to the west and central African cities were opened.
RAM was now changing, from providing flights to meet the demands of foreign tourists and Moroccan expatriates, to providing connections between European cities and African cities via the Casablanca hub. In 2002, the company leased two 767s to replace the single 747 in North American routes.

Morocco and the EU signed an open skies agreement in late 2006. This means that Royal Air Maroc will have to face tough competition from low-cost carriers eager to exploit profitable routes between Western Europe and Morocco. A further challenge arises from the high cost of kerosene and the fact that the company may have to drop some of its unprofitable domestic and international routes.

Royal Air Maroc became Oneworld's 14th member on 1 April 2020.

Corporate affairs

Ownership and subsidiaries

, the airline is owned by the Moroccan government; 53.94% of shares are owned directly by the state, an additional 44.10% are held via the Hassan II Fund for Economic and Social Development. The remaining 2% are owned by private investors including Air France and Iberia.

The government has considered the privatisation of the company for about 20 years; the latest plan, dating from late 2012, reportedly included selling up to 44% of the stakes to a Gulf airline.

, The Group Royal Air Maroc had the following subsidiaries:

 Royal Air Maroc
 RAM Cargo
 Royal Air Maroc Express
 Atlas Aérotechnic Industries
 RAM Academy

Former RAM subsidiaries include:
It intended to be the new Gabonese flag carrier.

Amadeus Morocco
Atlas Blue: RAM's fully owned low-cost subsidiary. It was created on 28 May 2004, and started operations in July the same year. Based in Marrakech, it initially operated a single Boeing 737-400 that was transferred from its parent company and deployed on charter routes to France. Operations were integrated into RAM in 2009, while the fleets of both carriers officially merged on 10 February 2011.
 Atlas Catering Airlines Services
 Atlas Hospitality Morocco, a chain of hotels
 Matis, dedicated to the aircraft wiring industry

Business trends
Following restructuring, which included the removal of  medium-haul aircraft, the staff-to-aircraft ratio decreased from 110:1 to 58:1, whereas the ratio of passengers transported per employee increased from 1,054:1 to 2,329:1.

Full formal accounts do not seem to be regularly published; available figures for recent years are shown below (for years ending 30 October):

The airline carried 7.5m passengers in 2019.

Key people
, Abdelhamid Addou holds the CEO position.

Head office 
Royal Air Maroc has its head office on the grounds of Casablanca-Anfa Airport in Casablanca. In 2004 the airline announced that it would move its head office from Casablanca to the Nouaceur Province, near Mohammed V International Airport. MAP, the official state news agency, said that the construction of the headquarters and a 500-room conference hotel would take 1 year and 6 months. The agreement to build the head office in Nouaceur was signed in 2009.

Destinations 

, Royal Air Maroc served 94 destinations.

Codeshare agreements
Royal Air Maroc has codeshare agreements with the following airlines:

 American Airlines
 Brussels Airlines
 British Airways 
 Etihad Airways
 Iberia
 ITA Airways
 JetBlue
 Kenya Airways
 Qatar Airways
 S7 Airlines
 Saudia
 TAAG Angola Airlines
 Turkish Airlines

Frequent flyer programme
RAM's frequent flyer programme is called Safar Flyer. , cardholders can earn and redeem miles either by flying RAM, its direct subsidiaries, or its partner airlines Iberia, Etihad Airways and Qatar Airways; hotels and car rental companies offer benefits too.

Fleet

Current fleet

, the Royal Air Maroc fleet consists of the following aircraft:

Recent developments

, Royal Air Maroc (RAM) operated an all-Boeing fleet. In , RAM placed orders for 20 new Boeing 737 NGs plus two wide-bodied Boeing 767-300ERs in a deal worth about  billion. That same year, RAM became a new Airbus customer when it bought four Airbus A321s. In , the airline took delivery of its first Boeing 767-300ER.

After the carrier's Board of Directors agreed to buy a number of Boeing 787s on 29 July 2005, a memorandum of understanding for the acquisition of these aircraft was signed with Boeing on 31 Jul the same year.

In September 2018, RAM retired its sole Boeing 747-400. In December 2018, RAM took delivery of its first Boeing 737 MAX 8 and Boeing 787-9.

Future plans
In , RAM's CEO indicated that the airline was seeking new generation aircraft as a replacement for its ageing fleet, adding that the carrier will need some 20 to 30 new aircraft by 2020, and that the Boeing 787 was being considered for long-haul routes, whereas the Airbus A220, the Airbus A320neo, the Boeing 737 MAX,  and Embraer E-Jet E2 families were all being considered for medium-haul flights. A contract for the lease of Four Embraer E-190s was signed in mid-2014; the carrier took delivery of the first of these aircraft in November the same year.

Previously operated
Throughout its history, the carrier operated the following equipment:

Airbus A310-300

Airbus A321-200
Airbus A330-200
ATR-42-300
Boeing 707-120B
Boeing 707-320
Boeing 707-320B
Boeing 707-320C
Boeing 720B
Boeing 727-200
Boeing 737-200
Boeing 737-200C
Boeing 737-300F
Boeing 737-400
Boeing 737-700
Boeing 737-500
Boeing 747-100
Boeing 747-200B
Boeing 747-300
Boeing 747-400
Boeing 747SP
Boeing 757-200
Boeing 767-300ER
Britannia 300
Caravelle III
Caravelle VI-R
Douglas C-47
Douglas C-47A
Embraer E-190-100LR
Douglas C-54A
Douglas C-54B
Fokker 100
L-749 Constellation

Incidents and accidents

Fatal accidents
Of the 82 people aboard, 61 perished.
All 106 passengers and crew were killed.
Investigators concluded that the pilot deliberately disengaged the autopilot and directed the aircraft into the ground. All 44 passengers and crew died.

Non-fatal hull losses
14 November 1958: The undercarriage of a Douglas C-47A, registration CN-CCJ, collapsed on landing at Tangier Airport.
26 March 2003: The nosegear of a Boeing 737-400, registration CN-RNF, collapsed after landing at Oujda-Les Angades Airport.

See also
 Transport in Morocco

Notes

References

Bibliography

External links 

 
 Royal Air Maroc Corporate 

 
1957 establishments in Morocco
Airlines of Morocco
Airlines established in 1957
Arab Air Carriers Organization members
Government-owned airlines
Moroccan brands
Companies based in Casablanca
Organizations based in Morocco with royal patronage